is a Japanese model, entertainer, and actress.

Biography
After graduating from high school, Imai was listed in Vivi'''s "Vivi Nintei! Shin Charisma Dokusha File" Volume 7 as a reader model on February 2003. She later worked as a regular model in the fashion magazine Ray, and also worked as a "Private Level" image model.  In 2007, Imai, along with Misako Yasuda and Aki Higashihara, appeared in Uma na de: Uma to Nadeshiko, started her career appearing variety series and dramas. The program also made her gain interest in horse racing. After discontinuing Uma na de on December 6, Imai's first photo-book, Rica, was released.

On March 22, 2009, she participated in the Tokyo Marathon 2009 Women's 10 km Road Race.

On September 23, 2014, after the release of Ray's November issue, Imai married a man who is three years older than her, and announced that she graduated from Ray. She later became a regular model in Lee''.  On October 6, 2015, Imai was reported to have given birth to her first daughter. On February 2, 2022, she gave birth to her second daughter.

Filmography

Magazines

Shows

Horse racing

Dramas

TV series

References

External links
 

Japanese female models
Japanese television personalities
1984 births
Living people
People from Ageo, Saitama